That Woman (original title: Cette femme-là) is a 2003 French drama film directed by Guillaume Nicloux. For this film, Josiane Balasko received her third nomination for the César Award for Best Actress.

Plot
Woman cop, Michèle Varin can not forget the death of her son, February 29, despite medication, alcohol and psychotherapy. She spends her evenings doing puzzles, alone with her pet rabbit. Terrified, like every four years by the approach of a new February 29, it must investigate the murder of a woman found hanged in the forest. The starting point of an unforgettable intimate adventure.

Cast

 Josiane Balasko as Michèle Varin
 Éric Caravaca as Sylvain Bazinsky
 Ange Rodot as Léo Kopmans
 Frédéric Pierrot as Daniel
 Thierry Lhermitte as François Manéri
 Pascal Bongard as Evens
 Corinne Debonnière as Catherine
 Alex Descas as Denis
 Valérie Donzelli as Claire Atken
 Aurélien Recoing as Man Identification
 Hammou Graïa as Doctor Borde
 Yann Goven as Sylvain's friend
 Eva Ionesco as Madame Kopmans
 Jean-Baptiste Malartre as Commissioner Fauler
 Nathalie Nerval as Mother Michèle
 Clément Thomas as Yvan Thiel

Accolades

References

External links

2003 films
2003 drama films
Films directed by Guillaume Nicloux
French drama films
2000s French-language films
2000s French films